The Mountain Play Association is a 501(c)3 organization responsible for the production of theatrical events at the Sidney B. Cushing Amphitheater on Mount Tamalpais in Marin County, California.  The stone amphitheater, named for the owner of the railroad company which constructed the Mount Tamalpais Scenic Railway, is at an elevation of 2,000 feet and has 4,000 seats. 

The organization was founded in 1913, and is a member of Theatre Bay Area and the North Bay Theatre Group. John C. Catlin became the first president of the Mountain Play Association. He financed the first play in the Cushing Memorial Amphitheatre in 1913.

The Mountain Play presents one musical a year, in May and June. In 2014, they presented South Pacific, from May 18 through June 15. Past productions have included Hairspray, Fiddler on the Roof, and Hair.

The mission statement of the Mountain Play Association reads, "The Mountain Play Association’s mission is to produce an annual, spectacular, outdoor theatrical experience that nurtures an appreciation of Mt. Tamalpais, involves and strengthens the community, and builds on decades of tradition."

History

First performance

One of the oldest non-profit theater companies in the area, the Mountain Play staged its first theatrical performances in the natural amphitheater on top of Mt. Tamalpais in Marin County in 1913. The first Mountain Play produced was Abraham and Isaac. Members of the audience hiked the eight miles from Mill Valley or steamed up the mountain on the Mount Tamalpais and Muir Woods Railway, the "Crookedest Railroad in the World." The Mountain Play Association (MPA) was formed the following year. Congressman William Kent, who owned the land on the mountain where the amphitheater stood, was one of its vice presidents.

List of performances

Sidney B. Cushing Memorial Amphitheater

In 1916, Kent deeded the theater to the MPA. Twenty years later, MPA turned the theater over to the state park, which then surrounded it, and over the next ten years the Civilian Conservation Corps (CCC) worked to install the massive serpentine stones that now form the 4000-seat Sidney B. Cushing Memorial Amphitheater.  The theater was listed on the National Register of Historic Places in 2015.

Since 1977, when Marilyn Smith took over as executive director, the Mountain Play presented Broadway musicals on the mountain.

In 1980, the Mountain Play introduced sign language interpretation at its May performances on Mt. Tamalpais. In the early 1980s, special accommodations were developed for patrons with wheelchairs, including the grading of a path to the theater and the construction of a shaded wheelchair platform. 

In 1993, the Mountain Play expanded its 10-year-old programs for the visually impaired to include professional describers who provide simultaneous audio description. Equipment was upgraded in 1997, which enables users to sit anywhere in the theater rather than in a specially designated area.

A "Day on the Mountain" outreach program was introduced in 1993 to introduce low-income/at-risk children both to musical theater and to Mt. Tamalpais. Working with Bay Area social service agencies, the Mountain Play provides tickets and transportation to the show, pre-performance workshops and guided nature hikes on the mountain. Since 1995, the Mountain Play has also presented an annual performance at the Redwoods retirement center in Mill Valley for an audience of elderly patrons who can no longer make it up to the mountain.

See also
Mount Tamalpais State Park

References

External links
 Mountain Play Association

Non-profit organizations based in the San Francisco Bay Area
Outdoor theatres
Theatres in California
Performing groups established in 1913
Culture in the San Francisco Bay Area
National Register of Historic Places in Marin County, California
Theatres on the National Register of Historic Places in California
1913 establishments in California